Natalia Petrovna Osipova (born 18 May 1986) is a Russian ballerina, currently a principal ballerina with The Royal Ballet in London.

Early life and training
Born in Moscow, Osipova began formal ballet training at the age of nine at the Mikhail Lavrosky Ballet School. From 1996 to 2004, she studied at the Moscow State Academy of Choreography (The Bolshoi Ballet Academy), under the tutelage of Marina Kotova and Marina Leonova.

Career
At the age of 18, she joined the Bolshoi Ballet as a member of the corps de ballet. In 2005, she danced the role of Kitri in Alexei Fadeyechev's production of Don Quixote to critical acclaim and was promoted to soloist in 2006. She was named one of the 25 to Watch by Dance Magazine in 2007 and became a leading soloist in 2009. In 2010, she became a principal dancer at the Bolshoi Ballet, but resigned in 2011, citing "artistic freedom" as her reason for leaving.

After leaving the Bolshoi, she joined American Ballet Theatre as a guest dancer for their Metropolitan Opera House season. She danced Don Quixote with José Manuel Carreño, and both The Sleeping Beauty and Romeo and Juliet with David Hallberg. A week before her performance in The Sleeping Beauty, she was robbed outside the Met, but suffered only minor bruises and was able to perform. She lost only a pair of pointe shoes and a small hammer used to shape them. In December 2011, she joined the Mikhailovsky Ballet.

In 2011, Osipova performed in Roy Assaf's Six Years Later, partnering with Jason Kittelberger and the same year danced in Valse Triste by Alexei Ratmansky. The season then continued with her appearances in various solo performances, including in Ludwig van Beethoven's Moonlight Sonata and Yuka Oishi's Ave Maria.

On 8 April 2013, it was announced that Osipova would join The Royal Ballet as a principal dancer, having previously danced as a guest artist in Swan Lake. She cited the broader and more diverse repertoire as her primary motivation for the move. She debuted on 21 November 2013, in Romeo and Juliet, partnered by Carlos Acosta. She has also danced in The Nutcracker and Giselle, with Acosta and Federico Bonelli.

In 2016, she performed the role of Grand Duchess Anastasia Nikolaevna of Russia/Anna Anderson in a Anastasia.

In 2018, Osipova appeared with David Hallberg in Pure Dance, a refined ballet of Antony Tudor's The Leaves Are Fading from 1975.

In 2019, Osipova played the role of a mother in The Mother of Arthur Pita and in June 2019 she appeared in Gerald Fox's documentary film Force of Nature. Osipova also performed with David Hallberg, dancing Giselle at Lincoln Center in New York.

Repertoire
Osipova's debut as Kitri in Don Quixote on 7 November 2005 launched her solo career.

Personal life
Osipova moved to London in 2013; she is a naturalised British citizen. She formerly had relationships with dancers Ivan Vasiliev, to whom she was engaged, and Sergei Polunin. Osipova is engaged to American dancer Jason Kittelberger. They reside in north London together with their four dogs.

She contracted COVID-19 twice: in December 2021 and March 2022.

Awards
Grand Prix at Prix de Luxembourg International Ballet Competition (2003)
3rd Prize at Moscow International Ballet Competition (2005)
Ballet Magazine Soul of Dance Prize in the category Rising Star (2007)
Leonide Massine Award in the category of Significance of Talent (2008)
The International Dance Association Prix Benois de la Danse Award for performances in La Sylphide, Giselle, Le Corsaire and The Flames of Paris (2008)
Richard Sherrington Award (2008)
The Golden Mask award for performances in Twyla Tharp's In The Upper Room (2008) and La Sylphide (2009)
Special Prize of The Golden Mask jury for Best Duet in La Sylphide (2009)
UK National Dance Awards presented by The Critics' Circle: Best Female Dancer (2007, 2010 and 2014)

See also
List of Russian ballet dancers
List of prima ballerinas

References

1986 births
Living people
Russian ballerinas
Bolshoi Ballet principal dancers
Prix Benois de la Danse winners
Prima ballerinas
Principal dancers of The Royal Ballet
Recipients of the Golden Mask
21st-century Russian ballet dancers